This is a list of people on the postage stamps of India.

A
Sheikh Mohammad Abdullah, Politican, Premier and Chief Minister of Jammu & Kashmir (1988)
Maraimalai Adigal, Tamil lecturer, scholar and researcher (2007)
Jyoti Prasad Agarwala Cultural icon, nationalist, musician, poet and humanist (2004)
Salim Ali, Ornithologist, explorer, ecologist, teacher and writer (1996)
Dhirubhai Ambani, industrialist of Gujarat (2002)
 B. R. Ambedkar, founder of Navayana Buddhism, architect of the Constitution of India (1966, 1973, 1991, 2001, 2009, 2013, 2015, 2016, 2017)
Alluri Sitarama Raju, revolutionary (1986)
Annamacharya Saint, social reformer and singer-poet (2004)
Abdul Qaiyum Ansari (2005)
Mukhtar Ahmed Ansari Congress President Ghazipur
Frank Anthony Parliamentarian, jurist, educationist and philanthropist (2003)
Sree Sree Thakur Anukulchandra (1987)
Talimeren Ao, footballer and physician (2018)
M. V. Arunachalam, businessman and Chairman of Murugappa Group (2018)
Rukmini Devi Arundale (1987)
 Veeran Azhagu Muthu Kone ((2015)
Sri Aurobindo philosopher, author and nationalist
Chandra Shekhar Azad revolutionary (1988)

B
Bhagwan Baba, Ascetic, mystic and saint-poet (2002)
Sant Gadge Baba Religious philosopher, social reformer and saint (1998)
Sai Baba of Shirdi, saint and fakir, cross-denominational spiritual master (2008, 2017)
Homi Jahangir Bhabha, nuclear physicist
Harivansh Rai Bachchan, Hindi writer and poet (2003)
Ecoman Vijaypal Baghel, environmentalist (2001)
Hemwati Nandan Bahuguna, politician (2018)
Allah Jilai Bai (2003)
Kanika Bandopadhyay, Exponent of Rabindra Sangeet (2002)
Tarashankar Bandopadhyay, Bangla Author and Jnanpith Award Winner (1998)
Sibnath Banerjee (1997)
Thakkar Bapa, Social Worker (1969)
Radha Gobinda Baruah (2000)
Panna Lal Barupal (2006)
Basaveswara, Social reformer, From Karnataka (1997)
Vaikom Muhammad Basheer (2009)
D.R. Bendre, Kannada Author and Jnanpith Award Winner (1998)
Homi Bhaba (1996)
Rajarshi Bhagyachandra (2000)
M. Bhaktavatsalam (2008)
Raja Bhamashah (2000)
Neeraja Bhanot, Indian Flight Attendant and Ashok Chakra Winner (2004)
Subramania Bharati, poet and statesman (1960)
Mukut Behari Bhargava (2003)
Vishnu Narayan Bhatkhande musician (1961)
Acharya Bhikshu, Founder of Jain Svetambar Terapanth sect (2004)
Brajlal Biyani (2002)
Sree Sree Borda (2010)
Jagadis Chandra Bose, scientist (1958)
Sarat Chandra Bose, Freedom Fighter, President of Bengal Pradesh Congress Committee, Member of the interim cabinet
Subhas Chandra Bose, Freedom Fighter, President of Indian National Congress, Head of Azad Hind government
Louis Braille (2009)
Swami Brahmanand, Freedom fighter, member of parliament, social reformer (1997)
Buddha (1956, 2007)
S.D. Burman, Music composer and singer (2007)

C
Bhikaiji Cama, Freedom Fighter (1962)
William Carey, missionary
M C Chagla, Jurist, judge, educationist, diplomat, Union Cabinet Minister and Statesman (2004)
Arun Kumar Chanda (2000)
Krishan Chander, author (2017)
Prabodh Chandra (2005)
Thakur Anukul Chandra (1987)
Kittur Rani Channamma Queen of Kittur (1977)
Damodar Hari Chapekar, revolutionary (2018)
Bankim Chandra Chatterjee, novelist and author of "Vande Mataram"
Sarat Chandra Chattopadhyay, novelist (1976)
Prithviraj Chauhan, king during the Chahamanas of Shakambhari dynasty (2000, 2018: series of 4 stamps)
Subhadra Kumari Chauhan, poet (1976)
S.B. Chavan, politician (2007)
Father Kuriakose Elias Chavara (1987)
 A. M. M. Murugappa Chettiar (2005)
Rajah Sir Muthiah Chettiar (1987)
R.M. Algappa Chettiar (2007)
S. Rm. M. Annamalai Chettiar (1980)
Calava Cunnan Chetty, founder of a university in Tamil Nadu (2019)
Chhatrasal, Bundela Ruler (1987)
Dheeran Chinnamalai (2005)
Frédéric Chopin, Music composer for the Piano (2001)
Jaglal Choudhary (2000)
T.B. Cunha, Goan freedom Fighter (1998)

D
Jawaharlal Darda (2005)
Baba Raghav Das, Ascetic, reformer and freedom fighter (1998)
Chittaranjan Das Freedom Fighter, founder of Swaraj Party
Lokanayak Omeo Kumar Das (1998)
Lala Deen Dayal (2006)
D. B. Deodhar, Cricket Player (1996)
C. D. Deshmukh (2004)
Durgabai Deshmukh, freedom fighter and social activist (1982)
Nanaji Deshmukh, politician (2017)
Purushottam Laxman Deshpande (2002)
Ashapoorna Devi, Bangla Author and Jnanpith Award Winner (1998)
Bishnu Dey, Bangla Author and Jnanpith Award Winner (1998)
Ramdhari Singh Dinkar
Jairamdas Doulatram, politician and freedom fighter (1985)
Dnyaneshwar, saint (1997)
Kunji Lal Dubey (1996)
Henry Dunant, Red Cross founder (1957)
Guru Dutt, Director, actor and film producer (2004)
Hazari Prasad Dwivedi, Hindi author (1997)

E
Edward VII of the United Kingdom (1902)
Albert Einstein, physicist (2005)
Eknath, saint (2003)

F
Lalan Fakir (2003)

G
D.R. Gadgil, Economist (2008)
Bhaurao Krishnarao Gaikwad (2002)
Indira Gandhi, Politician and Indian Prime Minister (1984, 1985)
Kasturba Gandhi (1996)
Mahatma Gandhi (1948, 1998, 2001, 2005, 2007, 2008, 2009, 2011, 2018: series of 7 stamps for 150th birthday & 2018: India–South Africa Joint Issue, with Mandela stamp, 2019: series of 5 stamps for 150th birthday)
Rajiv Gandhi (2004)
Sanjay Gandhi (1981)
Virchand Gandhi, 19th Century Indian Legend (2009)
Gemini Ganesan Actor (2006)
Savitri Ganesan Actress (2011)
Tyagamurti Goswami Ganeshdutt (1987)
Balwant Gargi, writer and academic (2017)
B D Garware, Industrialist (2004)
George V of the United Kingdom (1911)
George VI of the United Kingdom (1937)
Mirza Ghalib, poet (1953)
Ghantasala, Playback singer and music director (2003)
Guru Ghasidas (1987)
Ritwik Ghatak, Script writer and Film Director (2007)
Santidev Ghose (2002)
V.K. Gokak, Kannada Author and Jnanpith Award Winner (1998)
Bhaskar Vishwananth Ghokale (2019)
Aloysius Gonzaga (2001)
Sagarmal Gopa, Freedom fighter (1986)
Tripuraneni Gopichand, Telugu Novelist and Film Director (2011)
Narayan Ganesh Goray (1998)
Babu Gulabrai, writer and philosopher (2002)
D. V. Gundappa, Kannada poet (1988)
Shyam Lal Gupt 'Parshad' (1997)
Sane Guruji, Socio/Political Development Leader (2001)

H
Waldemar Haffkine, Plague Vaccine formulator (1960)
Hafiz (2004)
Lala Hardayal, Freedom Fighter (1987)
Matangini Hazra (2002)
Walchand Hirachand (2004)
Dr. Hiralal (1987)
Allan Octavian Hume Civil Servant, Founder of Indian National Congress (1973)
Zakir Hussain (1998)

I
Vaidyanatha Iyer, freedom fighter, Madurai, Tamil Nadu (1999)

J
 Dr. Jagdish Chandra Jain (1998)
 Jayadeva
 Sir Phiroze Jamshedjee Jeejeebhoy, financier, philanthropist (1959)
 Sir William Jones (1997)

K
Kabir, poet/saint (1953, 2004)
Mohammad Kabiruddin (2019)
Zorawar Singh Kahluria, general in the Sikh Empire (2000)
Pratap Singh Kairon (2005)
Hemu Kalani
Ayyan Kali (2002)
Kalidasa, poet (1960)
Vi. Kalyanasundarnar (2005)
Krishan Kant (2005)
K. Shivarama Karanth, Kannada Author and Jnanpith Award Winner (2003)
Dhondo Keshav Karve, educator (1958)
Dr. Kailash Nath Katju, Freedom fighter (1987)
Udumalai Narayana Kavi (2008)
C. Kesavan, politician (2018)
Vakkom Abdul Khader (1998)
Bade Ghulam Ali Khan (2003)
Hakim Ajmal Khan, Freedom fighter (1987)
Mehboob Khan (2007)
Syed Ahmad Khan (1998)
Ustad Bismillah Khan, Shehnai maestro (2008)
Ustad Hafiz Ali Khan (2000)
Ustad Sabri Khan, sarangi musician (2018)
Vishnu Sakharam Khandekar (1998)
Rajesh Khanna, Actor (2013)
Martin Luther King Jr. (1969, 2008)
S.L. Kirloskar (2003)
Saifuddin Kitchlew, freedom fighter (1989)
Jhalkari Bai Koli (2001)
Abai Qunanbaiuly (1996)
Damodar Dharmananda Kosambi, mathematician, statistician, and polymath (2008)
T.T. Krishnamachari (2002)
Jiddu Krishnamurti (1987)
Hemant Kumar (2003)
Kishore Kumar (2003)
Tirupur Kumaran, Freedom fighter (2004)
Hanagal Kumaraswamiji, saint, holy leader (2017)
Pandit Hridya Nath Kunzru, Freedom fighter (1987)
G. Sankara Kurup (2003)
Kusumagraj (2003)
Swami Kuvalayananda (2019)
M.M. Kuzhiveli (2019)

L
Mohammad Abdul Aziz Lakhnawi (2019)
V Lakshminarayana (2004)
Rukmini Lakshmipathi (1997)
Nupee Lal (2004)
Henning Holck-Larsen, cofounder of Larsen and Tubro (2008)
Laxmibai, Rani of Jhansi (1957)
Madhu Limaye (1997)
Abraham Lincoln (2008)
Ram Manohar Lohia (1997)
Narayan Meghaji Lokhande (2005)
Harchand Singh Longowal (1987)

M
Anandamayi Ma (1987)
Madhubala, Film Actress (2008)
Mehr Chand Mahajan, Chief Justice of the Supreme Court of India (2017)
Begum Hazrat Mahal (1984)
Chaitanya Mahaprabhu (1986)
Gulabrao Maharaj, philosopher and Hindi saint (2018))
Kakaji Maharaj (2003)
 Sant Santaji Jagnade Maharaj (2009)
Sri Ramana Maharshi (1998)
Dr. Harekrushna Mahtab (2000)
Maharana Pratap, Indian king (1967)
Mahadevappa Mailar, martyr (2018)
Asrar Ul Haq 'Majaaz', Urdu Poet (2008)
Madan Mohan Malaviya, educator (1961)
B. P. Mandal (2001)
Nelson Mandela, (2018: India–South Africa Joint Issue, with Gandhi stamp)
Field Marshal SHFJ Manekshaw, Indian Army Officer (2008)
Vinoo Mankad, Cricket Player (1996)
Murasoli Maran (2004)
Chandragupta Maurya (2001)
Meera, princess (1953)
Balwantrai Mehta (2000)
Dinshaw Mehta (2019)
A.V. Meiyappan (2006)
Vijay Merchant, Cricket Player (1996)
Dwarka Prasad Mishra (2001)
Narendra Mohan (2003)
Atukuri Molla, poet (2017)
Syama Prasad Mookerjee, Nationalist (2001)
Lord Mountbatten of Burma, last viceroy and first governor-general of India
Muddana, poet (2017)
Mukesh, Playback singer (2003)
Ajoy Kumar Mukherjee (2002)
Muktai, Poet-saint (2003)
Pankaj Kumar Mullick (2006)
Giani Gurumukh Singh Musafir, Socio/Political Development Leader (2001)

N
Rani Velu Nachchiyar (2008)
Harakh Chand Nahata (2009)
J. P. Naik (2007)
C. Sankaran Nair, Nationalist (2001)
E.M.S. Namboodiripad, Socio/Political Development Leader (2001)
Dadabhai Naoroji, businessman, British MP, co-founder Indian National Congress (2017)
Raj Narain (2007)
Jaiprakash Narayan
R. K. Narayan, Writer (2009)
Nargis, actress and parliament member (1993)
Col. C.K. Nayudu, Cricket Player (1996)
Jawaharlal Nehru, Political leader and the first Prime Minister of independent India (1997, 2005)
Kamala Nehru
Motilal Nehru, freedom leader (1961)
Rameshwari Nehru, Women's rights campaigner (1987)
S. Nijalingappa, Ex chief minister Of Karnataka, Former of Modern Karnataka (2003)
U Kiang Nongbah, Nationalist (2001)

P
Shastri Shankar Daji Pade (2019)
Bipin Chandra Pal, freedom leader (1958)
Dr. B.P. Pal (2008)
Nanabhoy Palkhivala (2004)
Chittu Pandey
Mangal Pandey
Marudhu Pandiar Brothers (2004)
Vijaya Lakshmi Pandit (2000)
A.T. Paneerselvam (2008)
P N Panicker (2004)
Pāṇini (2004)
Govindaro Pansare (2003)
Ramakrishna Paramahamsa, Saint (1967)
Chaudhary Brahm Parkash, Leader and former chief minister of Delhi (2001)
Maharaja Bijli Pasi (2000)
Babubhai Patel, Pappaji on the "Pappaji and Kakaji" stamp, brothers and co-founders of the Yogi Divine Society (2018)
Dadubhai Patel, Kakaji on the "Pappaji and Kakaji" stamp, brothers and co-founders of the Yogi Divine Society (2018)
Manoharbhai Patel (2007)
Vallabhbhai Patel, Freedom Fighter, First Deputy Prime Minister and Home Minister
Vithalbhai Patel, Political Leader (1973)
Vithalrao Vikhe Patil (2002)
Biju Patnaik, politician (2018)
Shivahirao Ganesh Patwardhan, freedom fighter, physician, devoted efforts to leprosy patients (2017)
Ram Chand Paul, scientist, Vice-Chancellor of Panjab University (2019)
Sheikh Tambi Pavalar (2008)
Devaneya Pavanar, Tamil author (2006)
Baji Rao Peshwa (2004)
Savitribai Phule (1998)
Kavimani Desika Vinayagam Pillai (2005)
Thakazhi Sivasankara Pillai (2003)
T.V. Sambasivam Pillai (2019)
Rajesh Pilot, politician (2008)
S.K. Pottekkatt (2003)
Kavi Pradeep (2011)
Swami Pranavananda (2002)
Saint Mahamati Prannath, follower and namesake of Pranami tradition of Hinduism (2019)
Jagdev Prasad (2001)
L.V. Prasad, Film actor, producer and director (2006)
K.V. Puttappa, writer (1998, 2017)

R
Bishnu Prasad Rabha (2009)
Mohammad Rafi (2003)
Bishwanath Rai (2006)
Kuber Nath Rai, Sanskrit writer and scholar (2019)
P. S. Kumaraswamy Raja, politician (1999)
Shrimad Rajchandra, poet, mystic and philosopher (2017)
Alluri Sitarama Raju, Freedom fighter (1986)
V.K. Rajwade (2003)
M. G. Ramachandran, politician and actor (2017)
Tripuraneni Ramaswamy, Freedom Fighter (1987)
N.G. Ranga, Socio/Political Development Leader (2001)
N. T. Rama Rao Actor, Politician, Chief Minister of Andhra Pradesh
Swami Rangnathananda Maharaj (2008)
Dr. Burgula Ramakrishna Rao (2000)
Goparaju Ramachandra Rao (2002)
Kotamaraju Rama Rao (1997)
Durgadas Rathore (2003)
Sant Ravidas (2001)
Kasu Brahmananda Reddy (2011)
Yeduguri Sandinti Rajasekhara Reddy, Politician (2010)
Anand Rishiji (2002)
Svetoslav Roerich (2004)
Bimal Roy (2007)
Lt. Indra Lal Roy, Fighter Pilot, Distinguished Flying Cross (1998)
M.N. Roy, Freedom Fighter (1987)
Prafulla Chandra Roy, Scientist (1961)

S
Bhim Sen Sachar, Freedom fighter (1986)
Muhammad Ismail Sahib (1996)
Bhisham Sahni, writer and actor (2017)
Jubba Sahni, Freedom fighter and revolutionary (2001)
Veer Surendra Sai, Freedom fighter (1986)
Chandraprava Saikiani (2002)
Maharshi Bulusu Sambamurthy (2008)
Damodaram Sanjivayya, Politician and chief minister (2008)
Rahul Sankrityayan
Swami Sahajanand Saraswati (2000)
Krishna Nath Sarmah, Nationalist (2001)
V.G.Suryanarayana Sastriar, Tamil scholar and writer (2007)
Anna Bhau Sathe (2002)
S. Satyamurti, Freedom fighter (1987)
Thakur Satyananda (2002)
Viswanatha Satyanarayana, writer (2017)
Savithri (2011)
Krishna Gopal Saxena (2019)
Madhavrao Scindia (2005)
Samanta Chandra Sekhar (2001)
Bhaskara Sethupathy (2004)
Muhammed Abdurahiman Shahib (1998)
Shanker Dayal Sharma (2000)
Major Somnath Sharma, Paramveer Chakra (2003)
Indra Chandra Shastri (2004)
Ma Po Shivagnanam (2006)
Shivaji, Maratha King (1961)
Swami Shraddhanand (1970)
Baikunth Shukla, Freedom fighter and revolutionary (2001)
Raj Kumar Shukla, Freedom fighter, friend of Gandhi (2000, 2018)
Shrilal Shukla, writer (2017)
Yogendra Shukla, Freedom fighter and revolutionary (2001)
Radhanath Sikdar (2004)
M. Singaravelar (2006)
Arjan Singh, Marshal of the Indian Air Force (2019)
Bhagat Puran Singh (2004)
Giani Zail Singh (1995)
Nain Singh, pundit (2004)
Satyendra Narain Singh, freedom fighter & Bihar chief minister
Shyam Narayan Singh, Freedom fighter and legislator from Bihar (2012)
Shambhunath Singh, freedom fighter and writer (2017)
Suraj Narain Singh (2001)
Veer Narayan Singh, patriot (1987)
Padampat Singhania (2005)
Basawon Sinha (2000)
Anugrah Narayan Sinha, Freedom Fighter & First Deputy Chief Minister of Bihar (1988)
Alluri Sitaramaraju, Freedom fighter (1986)
Swami Sivananda (1986)
Dr. T.S. Soundram (2005)
R. Srinivasan (2000)
Potti Sriramulu (2000)
NMR Subbaraman (2006)
Yellapragada Subbarao, Scientist (1995)
M. S. Subbulakshmi (2005)
K Subrahmanyam (2004)
Tipu Sultan, Sultan of Mysore and Freedom fighter (1974)
Sant Kavi Sunderdas (1997)
Bhaktivedanta Swami (1997)
Janardan Swami (Saivite, 1914–1989) (2003)
Siddhar Swamigal (2004)
Swami Swaroopanandji (2003)

T
Rabindranath Tagore, poet (1953, 1961, 1987)
Oliver Reginald Tambo, politician (2018: India–South Africa Joint Issue, with Deendayal Upadhyaya stamp)
Purushottam Das Tandon, freedom fighter (1982)
Tansen, Singer (1986)
Jamshedji Nusserwanji Tata, industrialist (2008)
J.R.D. Tata, industrialist (1958)
Sachin Tendulkar (2013)
Mother Teresa, Humanitarian, Nobel Peace Prize Winner (1980, 1997)
Nikola Tesla, inventor and engineer (2018: India–Serbia Joint Issue, with Tesla stamp)
Prabodhankar Thackeray (2002)
Omkarnath Thakur, Classical Singer (1997)
Pandit Iyothee Thass (2005)
P.M. Thevar (1995)
K. Raghavan Thirumulpad, scholar and physician (2019)
Thiruvalluvar, Tamil poet (1960)
Bal Gangadhar Tilak, independence leader (1956)
Brihaspati Dev Triguna, expert in traditional medicine of pulse diagnosis (2019)
Acharya Yadavji Trikam, practitioner of traditional ancient Indian medicine (2019)
Sant Tukaram (2002)
Tulsidas, poet and saint (1953)
Tyagaraja, musician (1961)

U
Deendayal Upadhyaya, politician (2018: India–South Africa Joint Issue, with Oliver Reginald Tambo stamp)

V
Vallabhsuri, Jain saint (2009)
Saint Vallalar (2007)
Thillaiyadi Valliammai (2008)
G. Varadaraj (2006)
Vaidyaratnam P.S. Varier, Founder of Arya Vaidya Sala, Kottakkal (2002)
Thirumuruga Kirubananda Variyar (2006)
Raja Ravi Varma, Painter and artist (1971)
S. S. Vasan (2004)
M. L. Vasanthakumari, Carnatic musician and singer (2018)
 Sadhu T. L. Vaswani, Educationist (1969)
Sardar A. Vedaratnam (1998)
Randhir Prasad Verma, Superintendent of Police and Ashok Chakra Winner (2004)
Victoria of the United Kingdom (1854)
Ishwar Chandra Vidyasagar, Educator and social reformer (1970)
Tenneti Viswanatham (2004)
Visvesvarayya, The Great engineer and statesman from Karnataka (1960)
Swami Vivekananda, monk (2013, 2018: India–Serbia Joint Issue)
Pandit Suryanarayan Vyas, Author (2002)

Y
Ram Sewak Yadav (1997)
Sheel Bhadra Yajee (2001)
Yashpal (2003)
Paramahansa Yogananda, monk, yogi and guru (1977, 2017)
Maharishi Mahesh Yogi (2019)

Z
Bahadur Shah Zafar, Mughal Emperor (1975)
Bartholomaeus Ziegenbalg, Missionary (2006)

French India

See also
List of postage stamps of India

References

 

India
Stamps
Postage stamps of India
Stamps